Sultan Mansur Shah II ibni Almarhum Sultan Zainal Abidin Shah (died 1560) is the eighth Sultan of Pahang who reigned from 1555 to 1560. He succeeded on the death of his father, Zainal Abidin Shah in 1555.

Early life
Known as Raja Mansur before his accession, he is the eldest son of the seventh Sultan, Zainal Abidin Shah by his Royal wife, Raja Putri Dewi, daughter of Mahmud Shah of Melaka. Mansur Shah II married first to Raja Putri Fatima, elder daughter of Alauddin Riayat Shah II by his wife, Raja Puspa Dewi binti Sultan Mahmud Shah ibni al-Marhum Sultan Muhammad Shah. He married secondly after the death of his first wife, to Putri Bakal binti Raja Ahmad, daughter of Raja Ahmad bin Raja Muhammad of Terengganu.

Death
According to the classical Malay text, Bustanus Salatin, Mansur Shah II was killed in a battle against the Javanese Hindus that took place in Southern Pahang in 1560.

References

Bibliography
 
 
 
 
 

1560 deaths
16th-century Sultans of Pahang
16th-century murdered monarchs
Murder in 1560